Gladys Davis may refer to:

 Gladys Davis (fencer) (1893–1965), British Olympic fencer
 Gladys Davis (baseball) (born 1919), Canadian baseball player
 Gladys Rockmore Davis (1901–1967), American artist